Eric Nichols is the head men's soccer coach at Bowling Green State University. He has held that position since February 17, 2009, and has posted a 3–12–3 record in his first season with the Falcons. He previously served as an assistant coach at Davidson College. Before that, he was head coach at Ohio Dominican University from 2004 to 2007. From 2000 to 2003, he was an assistant coach at Ohio Wesleyan University. Eric Nichols has a wife and three kids.

He played collegiate soccer at Ohio State University. He played professionally for the Columbus Xoggz, Indiana Blast, and Columbus Invaders.

External links
http://www.bgsufalcons.com/coaches.aspx?rc=72&path=msoc

Bowling Green Falcons men's soccer coaches
Ohio State Buckeyes men's soccer players
Living people
Year of birth missing (living people)
Place of birth missing (living people)
Indiana Blast players
Columbus Invaders players
Davidson Wildcats men's soccer coaches
Ohio Dominican Panthers men's soccer
Association football midfielders
American soccer players
American soccer coaches
Association football fullbacks
Ohio Wesleyan Battling Bishops men's soccer coaches
Columbus Crew non-playing staff